Olivetolic acid cyclase (EC 4.4.1.26, OAC) is an enzyme with systematic name 3,5,7-trioxododecanoyl-CoA CoA-lyase (2,4-dihydroxy-6-pentylbenzoate-forming). This enzyme catalyses the following chemical reaction

 3,5,7-trioxododecanoyl-CoA → CoA + 2,4-dihydroxy-6-pentylbenzoate

This enzymes participates in the cannabinoids biosynthesis in the plant Cannabis sativa.

References

External links 
 

EC 4.4.1